Robert B. Tresville Jr. (May 9, 1921 – June 24, 1944) was an African American pilot who served in the original 332nd Fighter Group of the United States Army Air Forces, also known as the Tuskegee Airmen, during World War II. He was only the seventh African American to graduate from West Point.  He was Commanding Officer of the 100th Fighter Squadron and was widely considered to be one of the 332nd Fighter Group's most promising leaders.  He went missing in action after his plane went down over the Mediterranean Sea in June 1944.

Early years

Originally named Robert Leslie Tresville, Robert was born on May 9, 1921 to parents, Robert Bernard Tresville and Irma Eloise (nee Jones) in Galveston, Texas.  They later moved to Fort Huachuca in Arizona where his father, the band leader for the 9th Cavalry Regiment band, was posted. Robert's middle name was later changed from Leslie to Bernard making him Robert Bernard Tresville Jr. Shortly after his birth his father was transferred to Fort Benning in Georgia and became director of the 24th Infantry Regiment band. Robert had two younger siblings: a sister who died shortly after birth and a brother named Brittingham. Tresville graduated with honors from high school in 1938 and entered Pennsylvania State College. Shortly thereafter Congressman Arthur Mitchell appointed Tresville to the West Point after his first year. Captain Robert Bernard Tresville Jr.married Vivien Louise (nee Murphy) in 1943 and had a daughter who was born after his death .[3]

World War II 

Tresville applied for pilot training while at West Point and was sent to Tuskegee Army Air Field where he was trained as a single engine pilot. He graduated as a member of Class 42-K on December 13, 1942 and then traveled back to West Point where he was commissioned a Second Lieutenant in the Regular Army of the United States. In December 1943, Tresville was appointed Commanding Officer of the 100th Fighter Squadron succeeding the command of Lieutenant Elwood Driver. As part of the 332nd Fighter Group, Tresville and the 100th Fighter Squadron were deployed to Europe and arrived in Italy on January 29, 1944.

On June 24, 1944, Tresville was assigned to lead a mission over the Mediterranean Sea to strafe an enemy supply line located west of Airasca, Italy. The group was instructed to fly low to avoid being picked up by enemy radar. Nearing the target Tresville was unable to correct his plane as it slid off course and plunged into the water. Lieutenant Woodrow Crockett took over command of the group after Tresville's plane crashed and led them safely back to Ramitelli Air Field in Italy. Tresville is among the names listed on the Tablets of the Missing at the Sicily–Rome American Cemetery and Memorial in Italy.

Prior to his death, Tresville had successfully completed 23 missions and had distinguished himself both in terms of the leadership and courage that he displayed.  These traits earned him the respect and admiration of his fellow pilots.

Awards
Air Medal
Purple Heart.
Congressional Gold Medal awarded to the Tuskegee Airmen in 2006

See also
 Dogfights (TV series)
 List of Tuskegee Airmen
 Military history of African Americans
 The Tuskegee Airmen (movie)

References

External links 
 Tuskegee Airmen Pilot Listing
 Tresville, Robert B. (Tuskegee Airmen), CPT
 Tuskegee Airmen Archive
 

1921 births
1944 deaths
Tuskegee Airmen
African-American aviators
People from Galveston, Texas
Aviators from Texas
Aviators from Arizona
United States Army Air Forces personnel killed in World War II
Missing in action of World War II
Aerial disappearances of military personnel in action
Aviators killed in aviation accidents or incidents in Italy
Victims of aviation accidents or incidents in 1944